Badla may refer to:
 Badla (stock trading), a carry-forward system in stock trading
 Badla, Bangladesh, a settlement on the Dhanu River in Bangladesh
 Badla, Purba Bardhaman, a village in West Bengal, India
 Badla (1943 film), a 1943 Hindi film
 Badla (1974 film); see List of Bollywood films of 1974
 Badla (1977 film), an Marathi language Indian film
 Badla (2019 film), an Indian Hindi-language mystery thriller